The Bianca C. was a passenger ship that sank on two occasions, the first time in France before being completed, and the second time after an explosion and fire off the island of Grenada.

History

Built during World War II at the boatyard of La Ciotat, a town on the southern coast of France, the ship was first launched in June 1944 under the name Maréchal Pétain.  Construction had not yet been completed, so the ship was towed to Port de Bouc, near Marseille, where she was scuttled by the Germans in August.  When the hull was raised, it was renamed La Marseillaise and towed to Toulon before being returned to La Ciotat to be refitted as a cruise ship.  When the remodeling was completed in July 1949, she sailed to Yokohama.  In 1957, the ship was given the name Arosa Sky after being sold to Panama's Arosa Line.  She was refitted again and became the company's flagship. She was chartered by the exchange organization American Field Service to bring students between the U.S. and Europe.  Within two years Arosa Line was forced to sell the ship to Costa Line, an Italian company also known as Linea C.  After that 1959 sale, the ship was renamed the Bianca C. (the second Costa C ship so named) for one of the owner's daughters, and was refurbished once again.  The Bianca C.'''s main route ran from Italy to Venezuela, including stops in the Caribbean.

Sinking
In October 1961, the ship was on a trip from Naples to La Guaira, Venezuela. On October 22, it docked off Grenada when an explosion occurred in the engine room in the early hours of the morning.  One crewman died immediately, and eight others were injured.  As fires broke out, approximately 700 passengers and crew scrambled to abandon the ship while Grenadian fishermen and boat owners,  awakened by the noise of the explosion,  near the harbor of St. George's rushed to help.  Survivors were taken to the capital, where makeshift hospitals were hastily established to provide shelter and food. Because Grenada did not have the equipment to quench such a large fire, a call for help was sent and was received by the British frigate  at Puerto Rico.  It took two days for the Londonderry to arrive, and by that time the Bianca C. had begun to sink.  The burning ship was in the main anchorage and would block the harbor if it sank there, so a Londonderry boarding party boarded the flaming ship to attach a towline.  The anchor lines of the Bianca C. were burned, and today the anchors are still at the mouth of the St. George's harbor.  Meanwhile, the Londonderry moved to tow the Bianca C., but the latter ship was listing to port.  Thousands of Grenadians watched from the mountains as the tow progressed for six hours, but the Bianca C.. had only moved three miles (5 km) when a squall started and the towline broke.  The Bianca C. sank quickly into  of water, about a mile from the popular tourist beach at Grand Anse.

Wreck
In the 1970s, a Trinidadian firm salvaged the Bianca C.'s propellers and sold them for scrap. A bronze statue of Christ of the Abyss was given by the Costa Line to Grenada in appreciation of the country's hospitality, and the statue stands in the Carenage surrounding the harbor at St. George's.The Times named the Bianca C.'' as one of the top ten wreck diving sites in the world.

See also

References

External links
Dive Grenada The "Bianca C." Story

1944 ships
History of British Grenada
Passenger ships of France
Ships built in France
Ships of Costa Cruises
Shipwrecks in the Caribbean Sea
Wreck diving sites
Maritime incidents in August 1944
Maritime incidents in 1961
October 1961 events